Samuel Rhoads Fisher was the secretary of the Navy of the Republic of Texas.

He was born in Pennsylvania on December 31, 1794 and settled in Texas in 1830 with his wife and four children in the Matagorda area. He represented Matagorda Municipality in the Convention of 1836 at Washington-on-the-Brazos where he signed the Texas Declaration of Independence.  President Sam Houston nominated Fisher as Secretary of the Texas Navy and the appointment was confirmed by the Senate on October 28, 1836.

A letter to presidential candidate Mirabeau B. Lamar in August 1838 from George Wheelwright urged reconsideration of Fisher for Secretary for the good of the navy and defense of the Republic and Houston suspended Fisher from office in October 1837, to secure "harmony and efficiency".  Many in the senate opposed the move and the Senate ordered Fisher's reinstatement on October 18, 1837. This event was a major incident in the early days of the Republic of Texas and added to the severe split between the various factions in the government.

Sam Houston Dixon in "The Men Who Made Texas Free" wrote that:

Fisher died on March 14, 1839, and was buried at Matagorda. Fisher County, established in 1876, was named after him.

See also

Battle of the Brazos River

References

Sources

Detailed biography
The Handbook of Texas Online.
Linda Ericson Devereaux, The Texas Navy (Nacogdoches, Texas, 1983). 
Jim Dan Hill, The Texas Navy (New York: Barnes, 1962). 
Louis Wiltz Kemp, The Signers of the Texas Declaration of Independence (Salado, Texas: Anson Jones, 1944; rpt. 1959).

1794 births
1839 deaths
People of the Texas Revolution
Texas Navy
People from Pennsylvania
Signers of the Texas Declaration of Independence